RuPaul's Drag Race is an American reality competition television series produced by World of Wonder for Logo TV. The show documents RuPaul in his search for "America's next drag superstar." Queen RuPaul plays the roles of host, mentor, and source of inspiration for this series, as contestants are given different challenges each week. RuPaul's Drag Race employs a panel of judges, including RuPaul, Michelle Visage and a host of other guest judges, who critique contestants' progress throughout the competition. The title of the show is a play on drag queen and drag racing, and the title sequence and song "Drag Race" both have a drag-racing theme.

RuPaul's Drag Race has spanned fourteen seasons and inspired the spin-off shows RuPaul's Drag U , RuPaul's Drag Race: All Stars, and Drag Race vs The World. The show has become the highest-rated television program on Logo TV, and airs internationally, including in Australia, Canada and the UK. The show earned Rupaul a 2016 Emmy for Outstanding Host for a Reality or Reality-Competition Program, and the show itself was awarded as an Outstanding Reality Program at the 21st GLAAD Media Awards. It has been nominated for 4 Critics' Choice Television Award including Best Reality Series – Competition and Best Reality Show Host for RuPaul, and was nominated for a Creative Arts Emmy Award for Outstanding Make-up for a Multi-Camera Series or Special (Non-Prosthetic).  In 2017, RuPaul's Drag Race was renewed for a tenth and eleventh seasons.

Series overview

Episodes

Season 1 (2009)

Season 2 (2010)

Season 3 (2011)

Season 4 (2012)

Season 5 (2013)

Season 6 (2014)

Season 7 (2015)

Season 8 (2016)

Season 9 (2017)

Season 10 (2018)

Season 11 (2019)

Season 12 (2020)

Season 13 (2021)

Season 14 (2022)

Season 15 (2023)

Notes

References

External links 
 RuPaul's Drag Race episode guide at TV Guide
 RuPaul's All Stars Drag Race episode guide at TV Guide

Lists of American non-fiction television series episodes
Lists of American reality television series episodes
RuPaul's Drag Race
Lists of American LGBT-related television series episodes